The 1995 San Marino Grand Prix was a Formula One motor race held on 30 April 1995 at the Autodromo Enzo e Dino Ferrari, Imola. It was the third race of the 1995 Formula One season.

Following the deaths of Roland Ratzenberger and Ayrton Senna at Imola the previous year, the track was heavily modified for 1995. New chicanes were built at Tamburello and Villeneuve corners, Acque Minerali chicane was removed and replaced by a right-hand corner, Rivazza was eased and the final corner became a single chicane, rather than the 5th-gear sweep previously.

Williams-Renault driver Damon Hill scored an emotional victory at the track at which his teammate Senna died a year earlier, while the Ferraris of Jean Alesi and Gerhard Berger finished second and third respectively. Despite being teammates from 1993 to 1997, this was the only occasion Alesi and Berger shared a podium racing for the same team.

Race report 
Michael Schumacher secured pole position with his time on Friday, in an exciting qualifying session. David Coulthard had looked to have set the fastest time on Friday but it only lasted for a few seconds before it was snatched back by Schumacher. Moments later Gerhard Berger - who was on a stupendously fast lap in his Ferrari - screamed towards the start-finish line and looked set to send the local Ferrari fans into raptures. Berger came agonisingly close to securing pole position and a mere 0.008 seconds separated the Austrian's Ferrari from Schumacher's Benetton.

Berger's performance guaranteed massive crowds for the rest of the weekend but on Saturday the weather was hotter and the track a lot slower. None of the fast men improved. Nigel Mansell, making his return to F1 with McLaren, qualified ninth, three places down on teammate Häkkinen.

Before the race, all the drivers participated in a one-minute silence in the memory of Roland Ratzenberger and Ayrton Senna who had died a year earlier at the same track.

The weather took a turn on race day and Sunday morning was greeted with steady rain but the rain did not deter the fans and the hillsides of Imola were packed with the joyful Ferrari fans from dawn onwards. As the grid lined up teams had to decide whether to race on slick tyres or on wets. Six drivers chose wet tyres: the first five on the grid and Rubens Barrichello in 10th place. By the end of the first lap the men on wet tyres were lying 1-2-3-4-5-6 and everyone else was waiting for the track to dry. The drivers on wets gained about five seconds a lap on their rivals. Then they started coming in. Schumacher's race lasted only half a lap after his pit stop because, on the way up to the top of the circuit, the Benetton snapped suddenly to the right and hit the wall hard. It looked like a driver of a very sensitive car making a mistake on slicks in damp conditions, but Schumacher said it was a car problem.

With Schumacher out of the way Berger led Hill, Coulthard and Alesi. The latter pair put on a good show, ducking and weaving as they dived through the backmarkers.

The fight became more significant when Berger's Ferrari stalled during his next pit stop. This left Hill in the lead with Coulthard and Alesi on his tail. During the exciting pit stop sequence Coulthard and Alesi brushed but the Williams team did not spot a damaged front wing. An over-eager Coulthard exceeded the speed-limit when exiting the pits, resulting in the Williams driver receiving a 10-second penalty. Unfortunately for Coulthard the rules meant that the Williams team would be unable to change his now obviously damaged front wing when he returned to the pits to serve his penalty and so had to make a third trip to the pits to replace his damaged front wing, by which time his race was ruined. There was nearly disaster for Hill when a refuelling hose stuck during his final pit stop but he managed to get out ahead of Alesi.

In the midfield the returning Mansell collided with Eddie Irvine in the Jordan and both had to pit. The race ended up being 1992 champion Mansell's last race finish.

Hill won, with Alesi and Berger coming second and third. Coulthard was fourth and Häkkinen fifth, the McLaren a lap down, while Heinz-Harald Frentzen gave Sauber another unexpected point by finishing sixth. The Ferrari fans and the team itself were left asking what might have been had Berger not stalled in the pits while he was involved in a titanic struggle with Hill.

Classification

Qualifying

Race

Championship standings after the race

Drivers' Championship standings

Constructors' Championship standings

Note: Only the top five positions are included for both sets of standings.

References 

San Marino Grand Prix
San Marino Grand Prix
San Marino Grand Prix
San Marino Grand Prix